Fritz Kraemer may refer to:

 Fritz G. A. Kraemer (1908–2003), German-American military educator and advisor
 Fritz Kraemer (Waffen-SS) (1900–1959), Waffen-SS member during World War II